Northern Kings is a Finnish symphonic metal cover supergroup, made up of four well known musicians: Jarkko Ahola from Teräsbetoni, ex-Dreamtale, Marko Hietala from Tarot, ex-Nightwish, Tony Kakko from Sonata Arctica and Juha-Pekka Leppäluoto from Charon and Harmaja.

Their first single, "We Don't Need Another Hero" (originally performed by Tina Turner), was released in 2007, followed by their debut album Reborn. In late 2008, their second album Rethroned was released, headlined by the single "Kiss from a Rose" (originally performed by Seal). They last released a single "Lapponia" in 2010.

On 18 June 2022, Northern Kings made a comeback after being on hiatus for 12 years. The band performed at the 'Tuhdimmat Tahdit festival' in Nokia, Finland.

Discography

Albums 
Reborn (2007)
Rethroned (2008)

Singles 
"We Don't Need Another Hero" (2007)
"Hello" (2007)
"Kiss from a Rose" (2008)
"Lapponia" (2010)

Members 
Jarkko Ahola – vocals
Marko Hietala – vocals
Tony Kakko – vocals
Juha-Pekka Leppäluoto – vocals

References

External links 
Northern Kings at MySpace
Ragnarok Radio Interview

Musical groups established in 2007
Heavy metal supergroups
Finnish symphonic metal musical groups
Musical quartets
Musical groups reestablished in 2022
Musical groups disestablished in 2010